Alegrense Futebol Clube, commonly known as Alegrense, is a Brazilian football club based in Alegre, Espírito Santo state. They competed in the Copa do Brasil twice.

History
The club was founded on January 30, 1971. They won the Campeonato Capixaba in 2001 and in 2002. Alegrense was eliminated in the First Round in the 2002 Copa do Brasil by Botafogo, and by Criciúma in the 2003 edition of the cup.

Achievements
 Campeonato Capixaba:
 Winners (2): 2001, 2002

Stadium
Alegrense Futebol Clube play their home games at Estádio Benedito Teixeira Leão. The stadium has a maximum capacity of 5,000 people.

References

Association football clubs established in 1971
Defunct football clubs in Espírito Santo
1971 establishments in Brazil